The 2014 Copa San Juan Gobierno was a professional tennis tournament played on clay courts. It was the third edition of the tournament which was part of the 2014 ATP Challenger Tour. It took place in San Juan, Argentina between 13 and 19 October 2014.

Singles main-draw entrants

Seeds

 1 Rankings are as of October 6, 2014.

Other entrants
The following players received wildcards into the singles main draw:
  Marco Trungelliti
  Nicolás Kicker
  Facundo Alvo
  Pedro Cachín

The following players received entry from the qualifying draw:
  José Hernández
  Hugo Dellien
  Dante Gennaro
  Gianni Mina

Champions

Singles

  Diego Schwartzman def.  João Souza, 7–6(7–5), 6–3

Doubles

  Martín Alund /  Facundo Bagnis def.  Diego Schwartzman /  Horacio Zeballos, 4–6, 6–3, [10–7]

External links
Official Website

Copa San Juan Gobierno
Copa San Juan Gobierno
Copa San Juan Gobierno
Copa San Juan Gobierno